Catawissa Friends Meetinghouse is a historic Quaker meetinghouse at South and 3rd Streets in Catawissa, Columbia County, Pennsylvania.  It was built about 1789, and is a one-story log building on a stone foundation.  It measures 30 feet by 27 feet, 6 inches.

It was added to the National Register of Historic Places in 1978.

See also
 Roaring Creek Friends Meeting

References

External links
Quaker Meetinghouse, Third & South Streets, Catawissa, Columbia County, PA: 7 photos, 1 color transparency, 5 measured drawings, 5 data pages, and 1 photo caption page at Historic American Buildings Survey

Churches on the National Register of Historic Places in Pennsylvania
Churches completed in 1789
18th-century Quaker meeting houses
Churches in Columbia County, Pennsylvania
Quaker meeting houses in Pennsylvania
1789 establishments in Pennsylvania
National Register of Historic Places in Columbia County, Pennsylvania